The Spillimacheen River is a tributary of the Columbia River in the Canadian province of British Columbia.

Course
The Spillimacheen River originates just east of Glacier National Park. Flowing southeast, it collects the waters of several tributaries, including Baird Branch, McMurda Creek, and its main tributary, Bobbie Burns Creek, before emptying into the Columbia River near the community of Spillimacheen.

Spillimacheen Dam
The dam was built in 1955.

See also
 List of British Columbia rivers
 Tributaries of the Columbia River

References

Rivers of British Columbia
Tributaries of the Columbia River
Columbia Valley
Kootenay Land District